Mount Light is a mountain along the south side of Barcus Glacier,  east-southeast of Mount Nash, in the Hutton Mountains of Palmer Land, Antarctica. It was mapped by the Ronne Antarctic Research Expedition (RARE) – Falklands Islands Dependencies Survey joint sledge party of 1947–48, and was named by Finn Ronne for Richard Upjohn Light, then President of the American Geographical Society. The RARE had applied the name "Cape Light" to part of the extremity of Smith Peninsula, but that name is now dropped as Cape Fiske provides adequate reference to that feature.

References

Mountains of Palmer Land